Der Auftrag Höglers (English-language title: Hoegler's Mission) is a fantasy movie directed by Gustav von Wangenheim. It was released in 1950.

Plot
Högler, the former director of a steel plant now in East Germany, is a rich and ruthless capitalist residing in West Germany. He wishes to lay his hands on the new technical innovations that were developed by Dr. Thelen, who now runs the factory after it has been nationalized. Högler tries to besmirch Thelen by organizing sabotage in the factory, threatening to kill innocent workers to destroy the scientist's reputation. Two trade union activists - the West German Maria and the East German Fritz - who know each other since they have both fought in the wartime anti-Fascist resistance, unite to thwart the capitalist's plans.

Cast
 Inge von Wangenheim as Maria Steinitz
 Fritz Tillmann as Fritz Rottmann
 Gotthart Portloff as Dr. Thelen
 August Momber as Högler
 Axel Monjé as Dr. Kayser
 Alice Treff as Dr. Alice Giesebrecht
 Knut Hartwig as Dr. Petersdorf
 Horst Koch as Kern
 Lothar Firmans as Löffler
 Harry Hindemith as Krantz
 Arno Paulsen as Wiesner
 Eduard von Winterstein as Hufland
 Friedrich Richter as Dr. Breithaupt

Production
At 1949, after the foundation of both the German Democratic Republic and the Federal Republic of Germany and as the existence of a Cold War between East and West became ever clearer, the East German authorities instructed DEFA's filmmakers to focus on new subjects: rather than making purely anti-Fascist films, they were now to fan anti-Western sentiment in their works. Der Auftrag Höglers was the one of the first movies made under those demands. In addition, it was also the first East German film with a style conforming to Socialist Realism, that was also required by the cultural establishment.

Reception
The German Film Lexicon defined the picture as "utterly lifeless, Cold War-influenced film... but interesting as a historical document."

Dagmar Schittly wrote that the movie was a typical anti-Western work of the time, "a propaganda pamphlet against the West German saboteurs." Carsten Gansel and Tanja Walenski noted that it also featured a call for class unity, by presenting the ability of East and West German trade union members to cooperate.

References

External links
 
 Original poster on ostfilm.de.

1950 films
1950 drama films
German drama films
East German films
1950s German-language films
German black-and-white films
Films directed by Gustav von Wangenheim
1950s German films